Bo Mattias Flodström (born 26 April 1972) is a Swedish former professional footballer who played as a forward.

Playing career 
Starting off his career with the local club Linghems SK, Flodström went on to represent Linköpings FF, Åtvidabergs FF, and IF Sylvia in the Swedish lower divisions as well as IFK Norrköping for four seasons in Allsvenskan. His best season came during the 2000 Allsvenskan season when he scored ten goals in 24 games. In total, he scored 21 goals in 78 Allsvenskan games for IFK Norrköping. Flodström also represented IFK Norrköping in the 2000–01 UEFA Cup and scored two goals in four games as the club was eliminated in the first round by FC Slovan Liberec.

References 

1972 births
Living people
Swedish footballers
Allsvenskan players
Association football forwards
IFK Norrköping players
IF Sylvia players
Åtvidabergs FF players
People from Linköping Municipality
Footballers from Östergötland County